Ali Boulebda (born August 21, 1980) is an Algerian former professional footballer. He spent most of his career in France while making three appearances for the Algeria national team at international level.

Club career
On January 16, 2011, Boulebda signed an 18-month contract with Algerian club USM Alger. In July 2011 he was released, having made nine appearances during his time with the club.

International career
Boulebda made his debut for the Algeria national team on June 3, 2000, as a 78th-minute substitute in a 4–0 friendly win against Guinea. His second cap would come over six years later, on September 3, 2006, again against Guinea, in a 2008 African Cup of Nations qualifier which ended 0–0. Boulebda was subbed into the game in the 90th minute. His last cap came in a friendly against Burkina Faso on November 15, 2006, in Luynes, France. Boulebda was again a substitute coming on in the 70th minute while Algeria lost the game 2–1.

References

External links
 
 
 

1980 births
Living people
People from Souk Ahras
Algerian emigrants to France
Algerian footballers
Algeria international footballers
Association football forwards
Algeria under-23 international footballers
Competitors at the 2001 Mediterranean Games
Mediterranean Games competitors for Algeria
Ligue 2 players
Algerian Ligue Professionnelle 1 players
Nîmes Olympique players
Clermont Foot players
US Créteil-Lusitanos players
USM Alger players
Expatriate footballers in France
Algerian expatriate footballers
Algerian expatriate sportspeople in France